Gardendale is an unincorporated area and census-designated place (CDP) in Ector County, Texas, United States. The population was 1,574 at the 2010 census, up from 1,197 at the 2000 census. It is part of the Odessa, Texas, Metropolitan Statistical Area.

Geography
Gardendale is located in northeastern Ector County at  (32.022499, -102.378336). Texas State Highway 158 forms the northern edge of the community.

Demographics
As of the census of 2000, there were 1,197 people, 463 households, and 356 families residing in the CDP. The population density was 104.9 people per square mile (40.5/km2). There were 519 housing units at an average density of 45.5/sq mi (17.6/km2). The racial makeup of the CDP was 90.64% White, 0.50% African American, 0.67% Native American, 0.25% Asian, 6.68% from other races, and 1.25% from two or more races. Hispanic or Latino of any race were 14.04% of the population.

There were 463 households, out of which 34.1% had children under the age of 18 living with them, 67.6% were married couples living together, 5.6% had a female householder with no husband present, and 22.9% were non-families. 20.1% of all households were made up of individuals, and 7.6% had someone living alone who was 65 years of age or older. The average household size was 2.59 and the average family size was 2.98.

In the CDP, the population was spread out, with 24.8% under the age of 18, 8.6% from 18 to 24, 28.1% from 25 to 44, 26.9% from 45 to 64, and 11.6% who were 65 years of age or older. The median age was 39 years. For every 100 females, there were 106.0 males. For every 100 females age 18 and over, there were 107.4 males.

The median income for a household in the CDP was $50,069, and the median income for a family was $60,625. Males had a median income of $32,917 versus $25,758 for females. The per capita income for the CDP was $18,592. None of the families and 3.2% of the population were living below the poverty line, including no under eighteens and 4.4% of those over 64.

Education
Gardendale is served by the Ector County Independent School District.

Climate
According to the Köppen Climate Classification system, Gardendale has a semi-arid climate, abbreviated "BSk" on climate maps.

References

Census-designated places in Midland–Odessa
Census-designated places in Ector County, Texas
Census-designated places in Texas
Unincorporated communities in Ector County, Texas
Unincorporated communities in Texas